The Federal Prison Camp, Pensacola (FPC Pensacola) is a minimum-security United States federal prison for male inmates in unincorporated Escambia County, Florida, near Pensacola. It is operated by the Federal Bureau of Prisons, a division of the United States Department of Justice.

FPC Pensacola is located on Saufley Field, an outlying field of Naval Air Station Pensacola, 175 miles west of the state capital of Tallahassee and 50 miles east of Mobile, Alabama.

History
Operations began in 1988 when the Bureau of Prisons negotiated a partnership with the United States Navy to lease land and several excess buildings at Saufley Field in exchange for inmate labor.  In 2006, the Bureau of Prisons decided to cut costs by closing the Federal Prison Camp, Eglin, which was located at Eglin Air Force Base, in Okaloosa County, Florida, and moving the inmates to FPC Pensacola. In July 2009, Forbes magazine listed the prison as the number two "cushiest prison" in the United States. In October 2006 the United States Department of Justice indicted four people for bribery and providing contraband to inmates at the prison. In March 2007, the prison made headlines when an inmate escaped from a work detail at Naval Air Station Pensacola.

Notable inmates (current and former)

See also

List of U.S. federal prisons
Federal Bureau of Prisons
Incarceration in the United States

References

External links
Pensacola Federal Prison Camp – official website

Buildings and structures in Escambia County, Florida
Prisons in Florida
Pensacola